Nykyfor Oleksandrovych Hryhoriv (or Grigoryev, real surname Servetnyk; 1884–1919) was a Ukrainian partisan leader noted for repeatedly switching sides during the Ukrainian War of Independence and Soviet Ukrainian war.

Biography
He studied at a feldsher school, but interrupted his studies to volunteer for the Imperial Russian Army and fight in the Russo-Japanese War. After demobilization, he worked in Oleksandriia as an excise officer. During World War I, he was initially a praporshchik in the 56th Zhytomyr Infantry Regiment, eventually rising to the rank of staff captain and being awarded with the Order of St. George. During this time, he changed his surname to the nom de guerre Hryhoriv.

Revolution
After the February Revolution and the overthrow of the tsar, Hryhoriv was active in the military committees. He then deserted from the army and returned to Oleksandriia. At the end of 1917, he created a volunteer regiment of the Ukrainian People's Army, for which he received the rank of lieutenant colonel from Symon Petliura. Petliura also instructed him to create more units in Yelysavethrad. Hryhoriv initially supported the seizure of power by Pavlo Skoropadskyi and the establishment of the Ukrainian State, under the protection of the Central Powers. But he later founded a peasant detachment to fight against the new regime and re-established contact with Petliura.

In November 1918, when the Imperial German and Austria armies were withdrawing from Ukraine, an anti-Skoropadskyi uprising broke out in the Dnieper basin. The Directory headed by Volodymyr Vynnychenko and Semen Petlura came to power. The troops under the command of Hryhoriv captured  and Oleksandriia, after which he declared himself the otaman of the insurgent forces of "the land of Kherson, Zaporizhzhia and Taurida", although he actually only controlled Kherson. Hryhoriv's 6,000-strong force rejoined the Ukrainian People's Army as a separate division under the command of otaman Oleksandr Hrekov, but his command over these units was only limited.

In the ranks of the Red Army
Following the 1919 Soviet invasion of Ukraine, the Directorate lost control over much of Ukraine and Hryhoriv decided to join the side of the victorious Bolsheviks, as Petliura had not allowed him to attack the Allied intervention forces landing in Odesa. On 2 February 1919, more than a month after the proclamation of the Ukrainian Soviet Socialist Republic in Kharkiv and three days before the capture of Kyiv by the Red Army, Hryhoriv agreed to recognize the suzerainty of the government of the Ukrainian SSR and the command of the Red Army in Ukraine. He also agreed to transform his troops into regular units. The units commanded by him took the name of the 1st Trans-Dnieper Brigade and in a short time forced the forces loyal to the Directorate to withdraw from Kryvyi Rih, Znamianka and Yelizavethrad. Hryhoriv's move to the side of the Red Army forced the Ukrainian People's Army to withdraw to Podolia and Volhynia.

On 2-10 March 1919, Hryhoriv fought a fierce, ultimately victorious battle for Kherson against the Allied interventionists. Then, on 15 March, acting against the orders of the Ukrainian Front's commander Vladimir Antonov-Ovseyenko, he captured Mykolaiv, which was actually controlled by the local Bolsheviks. On 6 April 1919, Hryhoriv's brigade captured Odesa, which had been abandoned the day before by French intervention troops. On the spot, Hryhoriv allowed his troops to commit looting and transport the stolen goods to their place of origin.

Anti-Bolshevik Uprising

The successes achieved by Hryhoriv meant that, after the capture of Odesa, he was appointed commander of the newly-established , and he was proposed to be awarded the Order of the Red Banner. At the same time, his attitude and the conduct of his troops aroused increasing criticism among local Bolshevik commanders, especially when Hryhoriv unexpectedly did not support 's troops on their march towards Tiraspol. Vladimir Antonov-Ovseenko, fearing for both Hryhoriv's loyalty and that of Nestor Makhno's anarchists, decided to entrust him with the prestigious task of marching against Romanian forces in Bessarabia. During a meeting with Antonov-Ovseenko, Hryhoriv attacked the policy of the Bolshevik authorities in Ukraine, particularly food requisitions, but ultimately committed to leading his troops in towards Bessarabia.

However, Hryhoriv actually sent his troops for a three-week "rest", allowing the soldiers to return to their places of origin. His brigade scattered throughout Kherson, taking weapons, equipment and supplies, and for the next three weeks his soldiers engaged in looting. They also committed antisemitic pogroms and murdered of activists of local party committees.  Hryhoriv's troops then stopped recognizing the Bolshevik command. They began to distribute leaflets, which called on peasants to fight against the Bolsheviks in the ranks of "otaman Hryhoriv's partisans". In Yelizavethrad, Hryhoriv's troops destroyed the party headquarters and disarmed a Red battalion. On 8 May 1919, Hryhoriv issued the Universal, in which he called for "the Ukrainian people to take power into their own hands" and proclaimed "the dictatorship of the working people, the power of the people's councils of Ukraine." He called for the organization of village, district and governorate councils, with 80% of seats reserved for Ukrainians, 5% for Jews and 15% for other ethnic minorities in each, admitting representatives of all parties and non-party people that supported the concept of council power. He gained some support from the peasants, who turned against the Bolsheviks, refusing to accept forced food requisitions and repressions by the Cheka.

At the beginning of May, Hryhoriv's armed forces seized the area between Mykolaiv, Katerynoslav, Kremenchuk and Cherkasy. At the same time, Katerynoslav was handed over to the otaman by the Black Sea Regiment of sailor Orlov, until then fighting on the side of the Reds. Hryhoriv was also joined by sailors in Mykolaiv and Ochakiv, and even found some support in Podolia. At its peak, he commanded 15-23,000 people. On 10 May, the defense council of the Ukrainian SSR declared Hryhoriv to be an outlaw. On 15 May 1919, Red troops under the command of  recaptured Katerynoslav, but then they were quickly driven out of it again. Nevertheless, after the first clashes with the Red Army, Hryhoriv's troops began to surrender or return to the Reds' command. The main grouping of Hryhoriv's forces was defeated in battle at Kamianka. By the end of May 1919, Hryhoriv's rebellion was suppressed by the Red Army, the area he occupied was again under the control of the Bolsheviks, and the forces led by him shrunk to 3,000. However, his uprising had led to the collapse of the Ukrainian Front of the Red Army, contributed to the defeat of the Reds by the Armed Forces of South Russia in the Battle for the Donbas, and prevented the Red Army from marching further towards Bessarabia in support of the Hungarian Soviet Republic.

Hryhoriv's supporters managed to hold on to Beryslav, Kakhovka and Nikopol for some time, attacking military transports going to Crimea and raiding towards Oleksandriia. In June 1919, Nestor Makhno met with Hryhoriv, proposing a joint fight against both the Red and White armies. Both commanders decided to join forces, but their agreement quickly collapsed. Hryhoriv considered going over to the side of the Whites and subordinating himself to Anton Denikin, which the Makhnovists considered a betrayal. Hryhoriv was shot and his troops joined Makhno's forces.

See also
 Danylo Terpylo
 Green armies
 Mishka Yaponchik

References

Bibliography

External links 
 Encyclopedia of Ukraine article
 Ataman of Pogroms Grigoriev 
 Bio in Russian 
 Universal of Hryhoriv
 Timkov, O. Otaman Grigoryev: Truth and Myth.

1884 births
1919 deaths
20th-century executions
Executed military leaders
Executed Ukrainian people
People from Khmelnytskyi Oblast
People from Letichevsky Uyezd
People of the Russian Revolution
People of the Russian Civil War
Recipients of the Order of St. Anna, 3rd class
Recipients of the Cross of St. George
Recipients of the Order of the Red Banner
Russian military personnel of the Russo-Japanese War
Russian military personnel of World War I
Ukrainian guerrillas
Ukrainian military leaders
Ukrainian people of World War I
Ukrainian revolutionaries
People murdered in Ukraine